Andrew Leach may refer to:
 Andrew Leach (footballer)
 Andrew Leach (economist)